The women's 4x400 metres relay event at the 1988 World Junior Championships in Athletics was held in Sudbury, Ontario, Canada, at Laurentian University Stadium on 30 and 31 July.

Medalists

Results

Final
31 July

Heats
30 July

Heat 1

Heat 2

Heat 3

Participation
According to an unofficial count, 76 athletes from 18 countries participated in the event.

References

4 x 400 metres relay
Relays at the World Athletics U20 Championships